This is a list of Bien de Interés Cultural landmarks in the Province of Huelva, Spain.

List 

 Castillo de Almonaster la Real
 Castillo de Moguer
 Iglesia de San Martín
 Ermita de Santa Eulalia y su entorno "La Arguijuela"
 Torre de la Higuera
 Torre de la Carbonera
 Monument to the Discoverers (Palos de la Frontera)

References 

 
Huelva